The 1997 Tour du Haut Var was the 29th edition of the Tour du Haut Var cycle race and was held on 22 February 1997. The race started and finished in Draguignan. The race was won by Rodolfo Massi.

General classification

References

1997
1997 in road cycling
1997 in French sport